The Native Born is an Australian play written by Bert Bailey and Edmund Duggan under the name of Albert Edmunds. It was first produced in 1913 by Bailey's own company.

Synopsis
The plot is set in the region near Mount Kosciuszko during the early days of European settlement of New South Wales. Neal Blackmore, a land speculator, discovers a gold deposit on the property owned by selector John Hillgrove and tries to get his hands on it. Blackmore desires Lily Armidale, who is in love with Hillgrove's son Jack - who is loved in turn by Blackmore's sister, Alma. The Blackmores henchman Solly Steele uses a loaded whip to kill an old fossicker called Kosciusko Joe, who also knows about the gold deposit, and frames Jack Hillgrove for the murder.

Comic relief is provided by Miss Cruikshank, Lily's man-hating maiden aunt; a magician called Charles Spinnifex (who falls for Hillgrove's daughter Cissie) and his assistant Willie Staggers; and a Scottish policeman. During one scene, Spinnifex's magic abilities allow Jack to escape the villains; in another, they enable the heroes to play upon the superstitions of the Blackmore henchman, Barcoo. The climax involves Jack rescuing Lily from Blackmore's henchmen during a snow storm.

Reception
They play was popular, although not as much as Bailey and Duggan's earlier collaboration, On Our Selection.

Original cast
Bert Bailey as Charles Spinnifex
Alfreda Bevan as Miss Cruikshank
Mary Marlow as Lily Armidale
George Treloar as Neal Blackmore
Lilias Adoson as Alma Blackmore
Edmund Duggan as John Hillgrove
Alred Harford as Constable Finegan
Guy Hastings as Jack Hillgrove
Laura Roberts as Cisse Hillgrove
Fred MacDonald as Willie Staggers
George Kensington as Solly Steele
Arthur Betram as Kosciusko Joe
J K Lennon as Barcoo

References

Australian plays
1913 plays